If Symptoms Persist, Kill Your Doctor is the sixth studio album by Six by Seven. Its lyrics are inspired by an episode of a BBC TV programme called The Trap. The album is limited to 1000 copies.

Track listing
 "Nations" - 6:20
 "Radio Silence" - 5:40
 "Liberation" - 6:29
 "Push" - 4:54
 "World Army" - 4:55
 "Enemy" - 5:30
 "Diplomatique" - 6:21
 "War Nations" - 4:27

Six by Seven albums
2007 albums